The Lycée français international de Pondichéry is an international French school in Pondicherry, Puducherry, India.
The school provides education from pre-primary to lycée (senior high school), 3 to 18 years old.

The school is part of the AEFE network of 500 French high schools overseas. It was established as the Collège Royal on 26 October 1826 by Eugène Desbassayns de Richemont, then Governor-General of Pondichéry in French India, during the Bourbon Restoration.

In 2014, the school signed a memorandum of understanding with the Future Foundation School in Kolkata providing for student exchanges.

See also

 Agency for French Education Abroad

References

External links
 International French School Pondicherry
 Lycée Français de Pondichéry 

High schools and secondary schools in Puducherry
Educational institutions established in 1826
Pondicherry
1826 establishments in French India
Pondicherry
Education in Pondicherry (city)